Adisura aerugo, the verdant adisura, is a moth of the family Noctuidae. The species was first described by Felder and Rogenhofer in 1874. It is found in the Cape Province, Lesotho, KwaZulu-Natal, Transvaal, Zimbabwe and Botswana.

Its forewings are green, and its hindwings are yellow brownish.

References

External links

 

Heliothinae
Moths of Africa
Moths described in 1874